Euren is an unincorporated community in the town of Lincoln, Kewaunee County, Wisconsin, United States.

It has been noted on lists of unusual place names because of its pronunciation being similar to the word "urine".

History
Euren Is an old German settlement located In northern Kewaunee County within the boundaries of the Town of Lincoin along County Trunk S between Algoma and Dyckesville. Pronounced Oy-ren, It was settled and named by early German setlers called Bottkols who named their new home after a small village in Germany.

References

Unincorporated communities in Kewaunee County, Wisconsin
Unincorporated communities in Wisconsin